Masat may refer to:

Masat, Bayburt,  a village in Bayburt district, Bayburt Province, Turkey
Maşat Höyük, an archaeological site in Tokat Province, north-central Turkey
Masat, Hooghly, a census town, in Hooghly district, West Bengal, India
Masat, Diamond Harbour, a census town in South 24 Parganas district, West Bengal, India
MaSat-1, Hungarian  satellite, developed and built by students at the Technical University of Budapest